Dalan Musson is an American screenwriter best known for his work on Iron Sky: The Coming Race (2019) and The Falcon and the Winter Soldier (2021).

Career
In 2007, Musson started his career by writing the script for the video game The Golden Compass. In 2009, he served as a writer on the documentary film See What I'm Saying: The Deaf Entertainers Documentary. In November 2012, he was hired to write the screenplay for Jeremiah Harm. In 2014, he signed on to script the fantasy film Iron Sky: The Coming Race. In 2021, he wrote an episode for the Marvel Cinematic Universe series The Falcon and the Winter Soldier, titled "Truth", alongside series creator Malcolm Spellman. He gained notability by co-writing, with Spellman, the MCU film Captain America: New World Order (2024).

Filmography

References

External links
 

21st-century American male writers
21st-century American screenwriters
American male screenwriters
American male television writers
American television writers
Living people
Place of birth missing (living people)
Year of birth missing (living people)